MFC Metalurh Zaporizhzhia is a Ukrainian professional football club based in Zaporizhzhia. Reestablished in 2017, it is a "phoenix club" of the original Soviet factory team Metalurh that existed in 1935–2016. The original club holds several historical records of the Soviet football, particularly while participating in the Soviet second tier (in 1971–1991 known as First League). The club has the highest number of seasons spent in the Soviet second tier as well as the highest number of tournament points it earned. The club also is a three-times champion of Ukrainian republican competitions.

Following dissolution of the Soviet Union in 1991 and until 2015 the club was a member of the Ukrainian top tier and on couple of occasions competed at European club competitions representing Ukraine.

In 2015, the original club went bankrupt and in 2016 the Ukrainian Premier League finally removed it from its competitions. In 2016, it was announced that another amateur club from Zaporizhzhia (FC Rosso-Nero Zaporizhzhia) has officially changed its name to FC Metalurh Zaporizhzhia and intends to start participation at the Ukrainian Amateur Football League the same year.

In 2018, the Rosso-Nero's Metalurh was denied license for professional league competitions, while the city-sponsored club was admitted to the Second League.

With Metalurh–Rosso Nero already competing, in May 2017 the mayor of Zaporizhzhia decided to form a separate city club which was formed based on the existing Metalurh sports school of Olympic Reserve. On 31 May 2017 the Zaporizhzhia city council approved the mayor's initiative and created the city's club Metalurh Zaporizhzhia. On proposition of the Rosso-Nero's Metalurh to merge, the newly created club refused.

Youth Sports School of Metalurh Zaporizhya

Youth sports school is located right on the training fields of the main club, where before the Russian-Ukrainian war matches of the local championship of other sports schools were regularly held. this is the largest youth sports school in the city of Zaporizhya, as well as in the entire region.

History

Early years (1935–1946) 
The history of Metalurg began in 1935 when a steel production company, Zaporizhstal, formed the football club 'Stal'. By the end of the year a local sports union gave Stal the status of a main club in the region. Throughout the 1930s, the team appeared regularly in domestic competitions and often played against clubs from the Soviet Top League, the most notable of which was Spartak Moscow. The tough times of World War II soon followed, however, bringing decline to both Zaporizhstal and its team. Nonetheless, in 1946 the club was revived and in 1949, Stal won the cup in Zaporizhzhia Oblast.

USSR era (1946–1990) 
In October 1949, the team was renamed to 'Metalurg'. In 1950 Metalurg debuts in the USSR Cup and in the round of 64 they defeated Lokomotiv Petrozavodsk with the score of 5–0, but go out in the next stage, losing 2–3 to Torpedo Stalingrad. However, the very next year club went to eighth-finals, notably defeating Dinamo Minsk 1–0 and Lokomotiv Moscow 4–0 on the way. In 1953, the club debuted in the USSR Championship after becoming the champion of Ukrainian SSR in 1952. From 1953 to 1962, Metalurg played in USSR Championship division 'B'.

In 1963 Metalurg won a place in USSR Championship division 'A' and had some moderate success. They stayed there until 1971, when in the 1970 season club secured a position in division 'A' and a place in the USSR First League. In their first season they came in fourth place, which became the club's highest achievement in the USSR Championships.

Ukrainian leagues (1991–2015) 
In 1991 after the collapse of the Soviet Union, Ukraine became independent and Ukrainian Premier League was formed. Metalurh was among the founders of the League. The club has remained in the Vyshcha Liga for all 16 seasons with their highest achievement in the 1995–96 season, taking 5th place. The club's best performance in a domestic cup came in 2006, when Metalurh reached the final, there they met with Dynamo Kyiv and were beaten 2 goals to none, however this performance allowed them to enter the UEFA Cup next season. Zaporizhstal still remains as a largest club sponsor and actively finances most of club's expenses.

The club had always been in the top league, since the first season in 1992 until the 2010–11 season when they finished last position and were relegated to the Ukrainian First League. After one season in the Ukrainian First League the club was promoted back to the Ukrainian Premier League. During the 2015–16 season on 2 March 2016, Metalurh was recognized as bankrupt on decision of the commercial court of Zaporizhzhia Oblast and a liquidation procedure was initiated.

European history
Throughout its history in Ukrainian Premier League, Metalurh has entered the UEFA Cup on two occasions; the first in 2002–03 UEFA Cup after finishing fourth in the league the previous season. In the qualifying round they beat Maltese side Birkirkara 3–0 on aggregate, before losing 2–1 to English side Leeds United in the first round.

The second time club had to wait 4 years to qualify again. After finishing as runners-up in the Ukrainian Cup in 2006, Metalurh secured a place in the 2006–07 UEFA Cup. The club entered the competition in the second qualifying round, Metalurh defeated Moldavian side Zimbru Chișinău 3–0 over two legs. However, Metalurh went out in the first stage, losing to Greek club Panathinaikos.

FC Metallurh based on FC Rosso Nero (2016–2018)
FC Rosso Nero was created in 2009 by Andriy Bohatchenko who owns a pizzeria with the same name in Zaporizhzhia. The first two seasons the club played in futsal (indoor football). In 2011, the club won the Zaporizhzhia city Cup and the beach football city league. In 2012, Rosso Nero were runners-up at 8x8 football (variant of association football popular in Russia). In 2014, the club became a city champions by beating the defending city champions Motor Zaporizhzhia. The victory inspired Rosso Nero to apply for the Second League of national competitions. In fall of 2015, when Metalurh Zaporizhzhia started the process for liquidation, Rosso Nero offered to pass the legendary club to them, however no agreement was reached.

On 26 March 2016, in Zaporizhzhia held a meeting of non-governmental organization "Metalurh forever", at which it was decided to rename the "FC Rosso Nero" into "FC Metalurh". At the same meeting, the group adopted symbols and colors of the original club "Metalurh".

The club was denied in receiving certificate for the next season and was dissolved in June 2018. The Metalurh—Rosso Nero performance was terrible. It played 65 games at professional level (3rd tier) winning 9, tying 3 and losing 53 games. Its goal tallies was 49 goals scored while allowing 237 (-188). The Metalurh—Rosso Nero also took part in Ukrainian Cup where it was eliminated at its earliest rounds on both occasions.

MFC Metalurh Zaporizhzhia (since 2017)
On 6 August 2017, a new municipal football club MFC Metalurh Zaporizhzhia started its participation in the 2017–18 Ukrainian Football Amateur League with an away game against Yarud at Azovets Stadium in Mariupol. In 2016, the new club was established by the Zaporizhzhia city authorities based on a communal company "Tsentralnyi Stadion" (Central Stadium) which owns Slavutych Arena.

Stadium 

Throughout their history, the club has played in various stadiums around Zaporizhzhia, but in 2001 the Football Federation of Ukraine forbade Metalurh from playing in their home stadium, Tsentarlnyi Metalurh Stadium, due to security concern and the club was forced to play at the Avto ZAZ Stadium (which formerly belong to now-bankrupt Torpedo Zaporizhzhia). Soon after, the club's board approved plans to construct a brand new stadium for the team in place of the old one. Construction commenced in late 2004 and on 29 July 2006, Slavutych Arena was opened, in their first game on a new stadium Metalurh faced Ukrainian giants Dynamo Kyiv. The stadium is situated in a central part of the city, on a street that has been recently renamed after legendary Ukrainian player and coach Valery Lobanovsky.

The stadium is purposed for football only use and has a total capacity of 12,000 seats. It consists out of four separate stands, north, south, east and west, two of which are covered by a roof, stadium is equipped with a single, multi-colour screen with dimensions of 6x10m and a lighting system of 1400 lux. The pitch dimensions are 105х68 м. Lately it has often been used as a venue for the Ukrainian Premier League FC Zorya Luhansk, while Metalurh is forced to play at its own training base. Metalurh Training Base is also known as Velykyi Luh (Great Meadow).

Club's crests and logos

Sponsors 
The history of FC Metalurh dates back to a factory team 'Stal' that has been sponsored by one of the largest steel production companies in Ukraine, Zaporizhstal. The company has remained a sponsor of the club for over 70 years and now is a general sponsor of the club. The main partner of the club is OAO Zaporizhstalbud-1.

1935–2012: Zaporizhstal (Ihor Dvoretskyi)
2012–2015: Motor Sich (Oleksandr Bohuslayev)
2016–2018: Rosso-Nero Pizza (Andriy Bohatchenko)
2017–present: city of Zaporizhzhia

The official kit manufacturer for the club is company Nike and the official beer sponsor of the club is Slavutych.

Football kits and sponsors

Honours 
 Soviet First League:
 Winners: 1960
 Runners-up: 1958
 Soviet Second League:
 Winners: 1970
 Ukrainian Cup:
 Runners-up: 2006
 Ukrainian First League:
 Runners-up: 2011–12
 Championship of the Ukrainian SSR:
 Winners: 1952, 1960, 1970
 Cup of the Ukrainian SSR:
 Winners: 1951, 1952
 Runners-up: 1950

Players

Current squad

Coaching staff
 Head coach – TBA

League and Cup history

Soviet Union

Ukraine

FC Metalurh (Rosso-Nero)

MFC Metalurh

Soviet Union

Ukraine

FC Metallurh based on FC Rosso Nero

MFC Metalurh Zaporizhzhia

European record
FC Metalurh Zaporizhzhia participates in European competitions on few occasions since 2002 after playing its first game against Birkirkara F.C.

Officials 

 1957 – 1959 Aleksandr Timofeev (nachalnik komandy)
 1971 Viktor Zhylin (nachalnik komandy)
 1972 Petro Stupakov (nachalnik komandy)
 1973 – 1974 Nikolay Farafonov (nachalnik komandy)
 1974 – 1977 Hryhoriy Vul (nachalnik komandy)
 1978 – 1980 Viktor Beloblotskyi (nachalnik komandy)
 1978 Viktor Malakhovskyi (administrator)
 1980 – 1981 Yuriy Sevastianenko (nachalnik komandy)
 1981 – 1991 Viktor Mezheiko (nachalnik komandy)
 1981 – 1982 Anatoliy Semykopenko (administrator)
 1989 – 1991 Hennadiy Zhyzdik (president)
 1991 – 2006 Viktor Mezheiko (president)
 1993 – 1994 Hryhoriy Vul (nachalnik komandy)
 1994 – 1997 Oleksandr Tomakh (general director)
 1998 – 2001 Oleksandr Tomakh (technical director)
 2002 – 2006 Andriy Kurhanskyi (vice-president)
 2006 – 2012 Andriy Kurhanskyi (president)
 2012 – 2015 Andriy Shevchuk (president)
 2013 – 2015 Oleksandr Tomakh (sports director)
 2014 – 2017 Mike Snoei (sports/technical director)
 2016 – 2018 Andriy Bohatchenko (president/Rosso Nero)

Managers 

 Viktor Zhylin (1972)
 Yozhef Betsa (1976–78)
 Oleksandr Tomakh (1981–88)
 Ihor Nadein (1988–92)
 Anatoliy Kuksov (1994)
 Oleksandr Tomakh (1994–98)
 Myron Markevych (3 March 1999 – 15 May 2001)
 Volodymyr Atamanyuk (2001–02)
 Oleh Taran (1 Aug 2001 – Sept 12, 2002)
 Oleh Lutkov (interim) (Sept 12, 2002 – 1 Nov 2002)
 Ihor Nadein (2002)
 Ivan Katalinić (2003)
 Mykhaylo Fomenko (1 July 2003 – 31 Dec 2003)
 Anatoliy Yurevich (1 Jan 2004 – 30 April 2004)
 Sergei Borovsky (1 May 2004 – 30 June 2004)
 Valeriy Yaremchenko (1 July 2004 – 25 July 2005)
 Anatoliy Chantsev (interim) (28 July 2005 – Sept 19, 2005)
 Vyacheslav Hroznyi (Sept 20, 2005 – 30 June 2006)
 Serhiy Yashchenko (1 July 2006 – 16 April 2007)
 Anatoliy Chantsev (16 April 2007 – 3 Dec 2008)
 Oleh Lutkov (3 Dec 2008 – Sept 3, 2009)
 Vladimir Khodus (Sept 3, 2009 – 22 Oct 2009)
 Roman Hryhorchuk (22 Oct 2009 – 10 Nov 2009)
 Vladimir Khodus (interim) (10 Nov 2009 – 8 Dec 2009)
 Roman Hryhorchuk (2009–10)
 Oleh Lutkov (3 June 2010 – 3 May 2011)
 Hryhoriy Nehiryev (interim) (4 May 2011 – 1 June 2011)
 Serhiy Zaytsev (1 June 2011 – 1 June 2012)
 Anatoliy Buznyk (15 June 2012 – 13 July 2012)
 Ihor Luchkevych (interim) (14 July 2012 – 23 July 2012)
 Serhiy Kovalets (24 July 2012 – Sept 1, 2012)
 Anatoliy Zayaev (interim) (Sept 1, 2012 – Sept 6, 2012)
 Vitaliy Kvartsyanyi (Sept 8, 2012 – 31 Dec 2012)
 Serhiy Zaytsev (1 Jan 2013 – 29 June 2013)
 Serhiy Puchkov (10 June 2013 – 28 Oct 2013)
 Oleh Taran (28 Oct 2013 – 7 Nov 2014)
 Oleksandr Tomakh (interim) (7 Nov 2014 – 24 Feb 2015)
 Anatoliy Chantsev (24 Feb 2015 – 4 Dec 2015)

FC Metallurh based on FC Rosso Nero
 Vasyl Storchak (2013 – 2016)
 Illya Blyznyuk (27 Jul 2016 – Dec 2016)
 Viktor Zhuk (interim) (10 Jan 2017 – 7 June 2018)

MFC Metalurh Zaporizhzhia
 Volodymyr Shapovalov (6 August 2017 – 7 June 2018)
 Oleh Taran (7 June 2018 – 2019)
 Ivan Bohatyr (2019)
 Oleksiy Hodin (interim) (2019 – 2020)
 Volodymyr Mykytyn (27 August 2020 – )

See also 
FC Metalurh-2 Zaporizhzhia
FC Metalurh Zaporizhzhia Reserves and Youth Team

References

External links 

 
 

 
Association football clubs established in 1935
1935 establishments in Ukraine
Soviet Top League clubs
Football clubs in Zaporizhzhia
Football clubs in the Ukrainian Soviet Socialist Republic
Ukrainian Second League clubs
Avanhard (sports society)
Metallurg Voluntary Sports Society
Zaporizhstal
Metallurgy association football clubs in Ukraine
Phoenix clubs (association football)